Royston Sidney "Roy" Evans (5 July 1943 – 20 January 1969) was a Welsh international footballer who played professionally for Swansea City between 1962 and 1968, making 214 league appearances. Evans also played for Hereford United. Evans died in a car-crash on 20 January 1969, alongside Brian Purcell.

References

External links

1943 births
1969 deaths
Footballers from Swansea
Welsh footballers
Wales international footballers
Wales under-23 international footballers
Swansea City A.F.C. players
Hereford United F.C. players
English Football League players
Road incident deaths in England
Southern Football League players
Association football defenders